Group B of the 1996 Fed Cup Americas Zone Group I was one of two pools in the Americas Zone Group I of the 1996 Fed Cup. Four teams competed in a round robin competition, with the top two teams advancing to the knockout stage.

Venezuela vs. Puerto Rico

Brazil vs. Uruguay

Venezuela vs. Uruguay

Brazil vs. Puerto Rico

Venezuela vs. Brazil

Puerto Rico vs. Uruguay

  placed last in the pool, and thus was relegated to Group II in 1997, where they placed first in their pool of eight and as such advanced back to Group I for 1998.

See also
Fed Cup structure

References

External links
 Fed Cup website

1996 Fed Cup Americas Zone